Zhongzheng District (also Jhongjheng District) is a district in Taipei. It is home to most of the national government buildings of the Republic of China (Taiwan), including the Presidential Office, the Executive Yuan, the Control Yuan, the Legislative Yuan, the Judicial Yuan and various government ministries.

Overview 
The district is named after Generalissimo and the late President of the Republic of China Chiang Kai-shek. This district has many cultural and educational sites including the Taipei Botanical Garden, the National Taiwan Museum, the National Museum of History, the National Central Library, National Theater and Concert Hall and the Taiwan Film and Audiovisual Institute. Other museums include the Chunghwa Postal Museum, the Taipei City Traffic Museum for Children, and the Taipei Museum of Drinking Water. Much of the Qing-era city of Taipeh lies within this district.

High School and college students frequent the area immediately south of the Taipei Main Station. This area has a high concentration of bookstores, cram schools, learning centers, private tutoring centers and test-prep centers.

History
The district was formed in 1990 after the merging of Chengzhong District (城中區) and Guting District (古亭區).

Cultural institutions and museums

 Evergreen Maritime Museum
 Guling Street Avant-garde Theatre
 Insect Science Museum
 Mayor's Residence Art Salon
 Museum of Drinking Water
 Museum of Medical Humanities
 Nanhai Academy
 National Chiang Kai-shek Memorial Hall
 National Central Library
 National Museum of History
 National Taiwan Museum
 National Theater and Concert Hall
 Republic of China Armed Forces Museum
 Republic of China Presidential Museum
 Taiwan Film and Audiovisual Institute
 Wellspring Theater

Government institutions
 Presidential Office Building
 Executive Yuan
 Legislative Yuan
 Judicial Yuan
 Control Yuan
 Ministry of Culture
 Ministry of Foreign Affairs
 Ministry of the Interior
 Ministry of Economic Affairs
 Ministry of Finance
 Ministry of Education
 Ministry of Transportation and Communications
 Ministry of Justice
 Central Bank of the Republic of China (Taiwan)
 Supreme Court of the Republic of China
 Taiwan High Court
 Youth Development Administration
 Central Weather Bureau
 National Immigration Agency
 National Police Agency
 National Development Council
 Bureau of Audiovisual and Music Industry Development
 Bureau of Foreign Trade
 Bureau of Standards, Metrology and Inspection
 Centers for Disease Control
 Consumer Protection Committee
 Political Warfare Bureau
 Forestry Bureau
 Agriculture and Food Agency
 Taiwan Forestry Research Institute
 Taiwan Railways Administration

Historic sites

 Taipei City Walls
 Zhongshan Hall
 Taipei Post Office Building
 Taiwan Education Association Building
 228 Peace Memorial Park
 Taipei Guest House
 National Taiwan Museum
 Monopoly Bureau Building
 Bank of Taiwan Building
 Treasure Hill
 Qidong Street Japanese Houses (Taipei Qin Hall)
 Remains of Taipei prison walls
 Shandao Temple
Taiwan Provincial City God Temple
 Taipei Cultural Mosque
 Huashan 1914 Creative Park
 Cafe Astoria
 Qing Dynasty Taiwan Provincial Administration Hall
 Li Kwoh-ting's Residence
 Sun Yun-suan Memorial Museum
 Thome Courtyard

Educational institutions

Universities and colleges

 University of Taipei
 National Taiwan University School of Law and School of Medicine
 National Yang Ming Chiao Tung University Peimen Campus
 Soochow University Downtown Campus (Soochow University School of Law)
 Chinese Culture University Bo'ai Campus
 Chung Hua University Taipei Campus
 National Taipei College of Business

Primary and secondary schools

High schools:
Taipei Municipal Jianguo High School
Cheng Kung Senior High School
Taipei First Girls' High School
Morrison Academy

Elementary schools:
Affiliated Experimental Elementary School of the University of Taipei (ESUT)

Other educational institutions
Taipei Ricci Institute
Taipei Language Institute
Mandarin Daily News
Taipei Language Institute

Transportation
Zhongzheng District has the best transportation links of any district in Taipei. It contains Taipei Main Station, a major bus and rail hub. Taipei Main Station is a major stop on the Taiwan Railway Administration's Western Line, and the  Taiwan High Speed Rail. The Red Line, Blue Line, Orange Line, Green Line of the Taipei Metro and the Airport MRT connect the district, eleven stations are located in the district: Zhongxiao Xinsheng, Shandao Temple, Taipei Main Station, Ximen, Xiaonanmen, National Taiwan University Hospital, Chiang Kai-shek Memorial Hall, Dongmen, Guting, Taipower Building and Gongguan.

Hospitals
Two notable hospitals are in this district. One is the National Taiwan University Hospital. The other is the Taipei Municipal Heping (Hoping) Hospital, which was quarantined for being the center of the SARS outbreak in Taiwan.

Economy 
Chunghwa Telecom, and A.mart (Far Eastern Ai Mai) have their headquarters in the district. Pxmart previously had its headquarters in the district.

Markets
Several bazaars and traditional markets are scattered throughout the district. This includes streets and alleys associated either as a camera and photography bazaar, clothing bazaar, and traditional produce markets such as the Dongmen Market and the Nanmen Market. The Gongguan Night Market caters to the students of the National Taiwan University. Shopping malls in the district are Guang Hua Digital Plaza and Syntrend Creative Park.

Gallery

See also

 Taipei

References

External links

  

Districts of Taipei